The 2016–17 Ligue Inter-Regions de football is the ? season of the league under its current title and ? season under its current league division format. A total of 64 teams (16 in each group) would be contesting the league.

League table

Group West

Group Centre-West

Group Centre-East

Group East

References

Inter-Régions Division seasons
4